The department of the Territoire de Belfort consists of 9 cantons since the cantonal redistribution of 2014 which came into effect in March 2015.

Cantonal distribution of 1973 to 2014 
Between 1973 and 2014 the department of the Territoire de Belfort was divided into 15 cantons including the following:

 Canton of Beaucourt
 Canton of Belfort-Centre
 Canton of Belfort-Est
 Canton of Belfort-Nord
 Canton of Belfort-Ouest
 Canton of Belfort-Sud
 Canton of Châtenois-les-Forges
 Canton of Danjoutin
 Canton of Delle
 Canton of Fontaine
 Canton of Giromagny
 Canton of Grandvillars
 Canton of Offemont
 Canton of Rougemont-le-Château
 Canton of Valdoie

Cantonal redistribution of 2014

Detailed composition

References